Haidar Raad (born 1991 in Baghdad, Iraq) is an Iraqi football goalkeeper who currently plays for the Iraq Youth national team. and has been called for the Iraq National team by Wolfgang Sidka.

References

External links
Goalzz.com

People from Baghdad
Iraqi footballers
Living people
1991 births
2011 AFC Asian Cup players
Al-Shorta SC players
Association football goalkeepers
Iraq international footballers